Fool Moon may refer to:

 Fool Moon (The Dresden Files), a 2001 novel by Jim Butcher
 Fool Moon (film), a 2016 French film
 Fool Moon (band), a Hungarian a cappella group
 Fool Moon (song), a song performed by Anteros
 Fool Moon (play), a play by Bill Irwin and David Shiner
 Fool Moon, a 1989 album by Amon Düül UK
 Fool Moon, a 2008 album by Anslom Nakikus

See also
 Full moon (disambiguation)